Uitikon Waldegg is a railway station in the village of Waldegg in the municipality of Uitikon in Switzerland. The station is on the Uetliberg line, which is operated by the Sihltal Zürich Uetliberg Bahn (SZU).

The station is served by the following passenger trains:

The station is connected, by PostAuto bus route 201, with the villages of Uitikon and Ringlikon. The bus operates two or three times per hour on Monday to Saturday.

References 

Railway stations in the canton of Zürich